Chaghi District, also known as Chaghi District, is the largest district of Pakistan by area, located in the north west corner of Balochistan, Pakistan.

Demographics
At the time of the 2017 census the district had a population of 226,517, of which 118,973 were males and 107,537 females. Rural population was 210,252 (92.82%) while the urban population was 16,265 (7.18%). The literacy rate was 36.91% - the male literacy rate was 47.54% while the female literacy rate was 25.16%. 1,209 people in the district were from religious minorities.

At the time of the 2017 census, 76.13% of the population spoke Balochi, 20.48% Brahui and 1.88% Pashto as their first language.

Administration 
Chagai District is administratively subdivided into the following Tehsils and union councils:

 Amuri
 Chagai
 Dalbandin
 Nok Kundi
 Taftan
 Chilgazi

Education 
According to Pakistan District Education Rankings, a report by Alif Ailaan, Chaghai is ranked at number 91 nationally, with an education score of 52.06. The learning score is 55.58 and gender parity is at 60.11.

The national rank according to readiness is 91, with a readiness score of 55.58 and gender parity of 60.11. The school infrastructure rank of District Chaghai is 114 nationally, with a severe shortage of electricity with a score of 4.55 and building condition score of 12.27.

Lack of schools for girls is the main issue of the region.

See also 
 Chagai Hills
 Chagai-I
 Chaghai (disambiguation)

References

Bibliography

External links

 Chagai District Development Profile 2011 
 Chagai District at www.balochistan.gov.pk
 District Chagai -  Balochistan Police

 
Project-706
Districts of Balochistan, Pakistan